Daniel Hoch (born November 23, 1970) is an American actor, writer, director and performance artist. He has acted in larger roles in independent and art house movies and had a few small roles in mainstream Hollywood films, with increasing exposure as in 2007's We Own the Night. He is also known for his one man shows.

Theatre
Two of his three one-man-shows, Jails, Hospitals & Hip-Hop and Some People, were published together in 1998. In both pieces he explores the multi-cultural (and multi-lingual) New York he grew up in, providing adept monologues in the languages of the people, Cuban Spanish, Dominican Spanish or Nuyorican, Jamaican Patois or Trinidadian English.

A prevailing theme in Hoch's work, within its spectrum of unification and deep similarities under superficial differences, is the power of hip hop. Naive or street-wise white youth believing or dreaming that they are black, African-American kids dreaming of making it as a rapper, a Cuban street vendor's love of Snoop Dogg.

Some People followed his first endeavor, Pot Melting, and was broadcast on HBO in the mid-1990s, which granted Hoch more national exposure, allowing him to tour more cities to greater crowds. Hoch founded the Hip-Hop Theater Festival in 2000. Together, his three plays have won many awards, including two Obie Awards, a Sundance Writers Fellowship and the CalArts' Alpert Awards in the Arts in Theatre. In 2010 he won a Fellow award granted by United States Artists.

In 2008 Hoch's solo show Taking Over addresses the issue of social imbalance as viewed by people who are pushed out by gentrification in Williamsburg, Brooklyn.

In late 2011 to early 2012, Hoch appeared in Ethan Coen's one-act play "Talking Cure" presented as part of Relatively Speaking.

Appearances in other media
Like the subject of most of Hoch's monologues, his writings often examine topics in hip hop, race and class and he has been published in The Village Voice, The New York Times, Harper's, and The Nation.

He has been featured on HBO's Def Poetry Jam, in addition to his Some People being broadcast on that station. The film version of Hoch's Jails, Hospitals & Hip-Hop was released in 2000.

Hoch was cast in a guest role on a 1995 episode of Seinfeld, (season seven, "The Pool Guy"), but he objected to what he felt was ethnic stereotyping in the way his Hispanic character was written and tried to convince Jerry Seinfeld to change things. Hoch was eventually re-cast with another actor.

Hoch appeared in Spike Lee's film Bamboozled as Timmi Hilnigger, a parody of Tommy Hilfiger who proudly sells overpriced designer clothing to African-Americans, claiming, "We keep it so real, we even give you the bullet holes" and advising viewers to "stay broke, never get out of the ghetto, and continue to contribute to my multi-million dollar corporation."

He is also known for writing Whiteboyz, a limited-released 1999 film directed by Marc Levin  in which Hoch also stars with Mark Webber and Dash Mihok as three white Iowa teenagers who long for a gangsta rap life. The film also stars Piper Perabo and Eugene Byrd and rappers as luminous as Snoop Doggy Dogg, Big Pun, Fat Joe, dead prez, Slick Rick and Doug E. Fresh.

Hoch appeared on Robert Small's MTV Unplugged spoken word series.

Personal life

Hoch, who is Jewish, grew up in Queens, New York.

Filmography

References

Further reading
Robert Torre: 'Hoch, Danny (1970-)', Encyclopedia of Hip Hop Literature, edited by Tarshia L. Stanley, Westport, Conn: Greenwood Press (2009),121-122.

External links
 
 The Hip Hop Theater Festival's Official Site
 The CalArts Award Official Site
 Hoch's account of the Seinfeld experience
 Interview with Danny Hoch (MP3 link) on The Sound of Young America

1970 births
21st-century American dramatists and playwrights
20th-century American Jews
American male film actors
American performance artists
American spoken word artists
Living people
Musicians from Brooklyn
Slam poets
21st-century American Jews